XHFZC-TDT is a television station on channel 22 (virtual channel 44) in Zacatecas, Zacatecas. It is a noncommercial social station owned by NTR Medios de Comunicación through concessionaire Fundación Cultural por Zacatecas, A.C.

History
XHFZC and three additional television stations in Zacatecas were awarded in 2015.

Repeaters
Three repeaters of XHFZC-TDT have been authorized to operate by the Federal Telecommunications Institute:

|-

|-

|}

References

Television stations in Zacatecas
Television channels and stations established in 2018
2018 establishments in Mexico